Poland–Yugoslavia relations were historical foreign relations between Poland (both Second Polish Republic 1918-1939 and the Polish People's Republic 1947–1989) and now broken up Yugoslavia (Kingdom of Yugoslavia 1918-1941 and Socialist Federal Republic of Yugoslavia 1945–1992). Two countries established their relations in the interwar period when Poland regained its independence for the first time after the partitions while Yugoslavia was created after the unification of pre-World War I Kingdom of Serbia with the State of Slovenes, Croats and Serbs (former South Slavic parts of the Austria-Hungary). In the days before this unification Kingdom of Serbia merged with the Banat, Bačka and Baranja and the Kingdom of Montenegro. During the World War II both countries suffered heavy casualties and developed the Polish resistance movement and the Yugoslav Partisans movement.

After the end of the war until the 1948 two countries were in the Soviet sphere of influence. In 1946 two countries signed the Agreement on Friendship and Mutual Assistance. While the Polish Workers' Party needed a couple of years and Soviet support to gain the power in the country, Communist Party of Yugoslavia was able to establish control over the country already in 1945 without any significant Soviet support. This led new Yugoslav authorities to expect the status of an ally instead of a satellite state within the Eastern Bloc. Situation escalated in 1948 Tito–Stalin split after which Yugoslav relations with all Eastern Bloc countries, including Poland, were either suspended or significantly strained. Situation improved following the 1955 Belgrade declaration yet at this stage Yugoslavia was on the course of development of its Cold War non-aligned foreign policy. Relations of Poland normalized with significant number of Polish tourists spending their summer holidays on the Adriatic coast primarily in the Socialist Republic of Croatia. Formal cultural cooperation was reinitiated on the basis of the agreement signed in Belgrade on July 6, 1956. The relations were once again broken for some time during the 1968 Warsaw Pact invasion of Czechoslovakia when two countries were on the opposite sides in the conflict.

See also
Yugoslavia–European Communities relations 
Croatia–Poland relations
Poland–Serbia relations
Poles in Bosnia and Herzegovina
Poles of Croatia
Poles in Serbia
Macedonians in Poland
2019 Western Balkans Summit, Poznań
Death and state funeral of Josip Broz Tito
Poland at the 1984 Winter Olympics
Contemporary Art Museum of Macedonia

References

Poland–Yugoslavia relations
Bilateral relations of Yugoslavia
Yugoslavia
Bosnia and Herzegovina–Poland relations
Croatia–Poland relations
Kosovo–Poland relations
Montenegro–Poland relations
North Macedonia–Poland relations
Poland–Serbia relations
Poland–Slovenia relations